R. B. Bryant is an American former Negro league pitcher who played in the 1930s.

Bryant played for the Memphis Red Sox in 1937, and for the Philadelphia Stars the following season. In eight recorded career appearances on the mound, he posted an 8.75 ERA over 36 innings.

References

External links
 and Seamheads

Year of birth missing
Place of birth missing
Memphis Red Sox players
Philadelphia Stars players